Dariusz Jabłoński may refer to:
 Dariusz Jabłoński (director)
 Dariusz Jabłoński (wrestler)